Kormákr Ögmundarson was a 10th-century Icelandic skald. He is the protagonist of Kormáks saga which preserves a significant amount of poetry attributed to him. According to Skáldatal, he was also the court poet of Sigurðr Hlaðajarl and fragments of a drápa to the jarl are preserved in Skáldskaparmál.

The following stanzas represent some of Kormákr's love poetry. He tells of the first time he met Steingerðr, the love of his life. Read aloud with modern Icelandic pronunciation.

References

 Einar Ól. Sveinsson (Ed.) (1939). Íslenzk fornrit VIII - Vatnsdœla saga. Reykjavík: Hið íslenzka fornritafélag.
 Hollander, Lee M. (Ed.) (1949). The Sagas of Kormák and The Sworn Brothers. Princeton: Princeton University Press.
 Viðar Hreinsson (Ed.) (1997). The Complete Sagas of Icelanders, Volume 1. Reykjavík: Leifur Eiríksson Publishing. .

External links
 All of Kormákr's poems in the original language
 Russell Poole, "Composition Transmission Performance: The First Ten lausavísur in Kormáks saga", Alvíssmál 7 (1997): 37–60.

Icelandic male poets
10th-century Icelandic poets